Halina Sylwia Górecka (née Richter, later Herrmann; born 4 February 1938) is a retired Polish and German sprinter. At the Summer Olympics she competed for Poland in 1956, 1960 and 1964 and for West Germany in 1968. She won a bronze and a gold medal in the 4 × 100 m relay in 1960 and 1964, respectively. The Polish team set a world record in the 1964 final, but it was annulled after one teammate, Ewa Kłobukowska, failed a gender test in 1967.

In 1964 Górecka became a double champion of Poland: in 100 m and 200 m, adding to her earlier Polish title in the 4 × 100 m relay in 1954. In 1965, at an international meet in Dortmund, she defected to West Germany and went to Cologne to a friend Reinhold Herrmann. They married in 1966. Her appearance for West Germany at the 1968 Olympic Games in Mexico City did not result in any medals. In Germany Górecka worked as an office clerk. In 2012 her Olympic gold medal was stolen from her apartment.

References

1938 births
Living people
Sportspeople from Chorzów
Polish female sprinters
German female sprinters
Olympic athletes of Poland
Olympic athletes of West Germany
Athletes (track and field) at the 1956 Summer Olympics
Athletes (track and field) at the 1960 Summer Olympics
Athletes (track and field) at the 1964 Summer Olympics
Athletes (track and field) at the 1968 Summer Olympics
Olympic gold medalists for Poland
Olympic bronze medalists for Poland
Polish defectors
Polish emigrants to Germany
Medalists at the 1964 Summer Olympics
Medalists at the 1960 Summer Olympics
Olympic gold medalists in athletics (track and field)
Olympic bronze medalists in athletics (track and field)
Olympic female sprinters